The Directorate General of Income Tax Investigation is the law enforcement agency under the Ministry of Finance responsible for investigating violations of India's tax laws, including fraud, evasion and money laundering. The controlling authority is the Investigation Division of the Central Board of Direct Taxes.

See also

 List of Income Tax Department officer ranks
 Civil Services of India

Tax officials
Federal law enforcement agencies of India
Indian intelligence agencies
Income Tax Department of India
Year of establishment missing